The following lists events that happened in 2009 in Finland.

Incumbents
President – Tarja Halonen
Prime Minister – Matti Vanhanen
Speaker – Sauli Niinistö

Events
31 December – the Sello mall shooting

Deaths

1 January – Aarne Arvonen, supercentenarian, oldest living male person in Finland (b. 1897)
10 January – Pauli Salonen, Nordic combined skier (b. 1916).
23 February – August Kiuru, cross country skier (b. 1922)
15 May – Helvi Sipilä, diplomat, lawyer, politician and promoter of women's rights (b. 1915)
21 May – Christer Boucht, lawyer, adventure traveller and writer (b. 1911)
13 July – Uma Aaltonen, journalist and politician (b. 1940)
25 August – Mirja Lehtonen, cross country skier (b. 1942).

References

 
2000s in Finland
Finland
Finland
Years of the 21st century in Finland